The 1972 Bulgarian Cup Final was the 32nd final of the Bulgarian Cup (in this period the tournament was named Cup of the Soviet Army), and was contested between CSKA Sofia and Slavia Sofia on 12 July 1972 at Vasil Levski National Stadium in Sofia. CSKA won the final 3–0.

Match

Details

See also
1971–72 A Group

References

Bulgarian Cup finals
PFC CSKA Sofia matches
PFC Slavia Sofia matches
Cup Final